Stefan Uroš II Milutin (1253 – 29 October 1321), known as Stefan Milutin or Saint King, was the King of Serbia between 1282–1321, a member of the Nemanjić dynasty. He was one of the most powerful rulers of Serbia in the Middle Ages and one of the most prominent European monarchs of his time. Milutin is credited with strongly resisting the efforts of Byzantine Emperor Michael VIII Palaiologos to impose Roman Catholicism on the Balkans after the Union of Lyons in 1274. During his reign, Serbian economic power grew rapidly, mostly due to the development of mining. He founded Novo Brdo, which became an internationally important silver mining site. As most of the Nemanjić monarchs, he was proclaimed a saint by the Serbian Orthodox Church with a feast day on October 30.

Early life

He was the youngest son of King Stefan Uroš I and his wife, Helen of Anjou. Unexpectedly he became king of Serbia after the abdication of his brother Stefan Dragutin. He was around 29. Immediately upon his accession to the throne he attacked Byzantine lands in Macedonia. In 1282, he conquered the northern parts of Macedonia including the city of Skoplje, which became his capital. Byzantine Emperor Michael VIII Palaiologos began preparations for war but he died before their completion. The next year Milutin advanced with his brother deep into Byzantine territory all the way to Kavala. 

In 1284, Milutin also gained control of northern Albania and the city of Dyrrachion (Durrës). For the next 15 years there were no changes in the war. Peace was concluded in 1299 when Milutin kept the conquered lands as the dowry of Simonis, daughter of Emperor Andronikos II Palaiologos who became his fourth wife. In Nerodimlje župa Milutin had three courts, in Nerodimlje (protected by Petrič), Svrčin and Pauni.

Wars with the Bulgarians and Mongols

At the end of the 13th century  Bulgarian feudal lords Darman and Kudelin were jointly ruling the region of Braničevo (in modern Serbia) as independent or semi-independent lords. They regularly attacked Stefan Dragutin's Syrmian Kingdom, in Mačva, an area previously under the sovereignty of Elizabeth of Hungary. The Hungarian queen had sent troops to claim Braničevo in 1282–1284, but her forces had been repelled and her vassal lands plundered in retaliation. 

Another campaign, this time organized by both Dragutin and Elizabeth, failed to conquer Darman and Kudelin's domains in 1285 and suffered another counter-raid by the brothers. It was not until 1291 when a joint force of Dragutin and the Serbian King Stefan Milutin managed to defeat the brothers and, for the first time ever, the region came under the rule of a Serb, as it was annexed by Dragutin. Responding to Dragutin's annexation of  Braničevo the Bulgarian prince named Shishman that came to rule the semi-independent principality of Vidin around 1280, began to attack the Serbian domains to his west. 

Shishman was a vassal of Nogai Khan, Khan of the Golden Horde and sought to expand his territories to the west, invading Serbia coming as far as Hvosno, the Bulgarians failed to capture Zdrelo (near Peć) and were pursued back to Vidin by the Serbs. Milutin devastated Vidin and the rest of Shishman's dominion, making Shishman take refuge on the other side of the Danube. The two however became allies after Milutin married Serbian župan Dragoš to the daughter of Shishman, later Milutin would give his daughter  Neda (with title Anna) to Shishman's son Michael who would become the Tsar of Bulgaria in 1323. 

Milutin and Nogai Khan would soon come into conflict because of the war with the Tsardom of Vidin. Nogai launched a campaign against Serbia but Milutin offered peace sending his son Stefan Dečanski to Nogai's court. Stefan stayed with his entourage there until 1296 or Nogai Khan's death in 1299.

Feud of the brothers
Disputes began between Milutin and his brother Stefan Dragutin after a peace treaty with the Byzantine Empire was signed in 1299. Dragutin in the meantime held lands from Braničevo in the east to the Bosna river in the west. His capital was Belgrade. War broke out between the brothers and lasted, with sporadic cease-fires, until Dragutin's death in 1314. By 1309, Milutin appointed his son, future king Stefan Dečanski, as governor of Zeta. This meant that Stefan Dečanski was to be heir to the throne in Serbia and not Dragutin's son Stefan Vladislav II. In order to gain an edge in his feud with Dragutin, Milutin sought support from the Papal States, even offering to convert himself and Serbs collectivly to Catholicism.

Battles and supreme leadership

He captured Durrës in 1296. The Battle of Gallipoli (1312) was fought by Serbian troops sent by Stefan Milutin to aid Byzantine Emperor Andronikos in the defense of his lands against the Turks. After numerous attempts in subduing the Turks, the rapidly crumbling Byzantine Empire was forced to enlist the help of Serbia. The Turks were looting and pillaging the countryside and the two armies converged at the Gallipoli peninsula where the Turks were decisively defeated. Out of the gratitude to Serbia, the town of Kucovo was donated.

Upon Stefan Dragutin's death in 1316, Milutin conquered most of his lands including Belgrade. That was not acceptable for king Charles I of Hungary, who started to seek allies against Serbia, including those among Albanian nobles, who were also receiving support from Pope John XXII. Milutin started to persecute Catholics which led to the crusade started by Pope John XXII.

In 1318, there was an open revolt of Albanian nobles against the rule of Stefan Milutin, which is sometimes credited to be incited by Prince Philip I of Taranto and Pope John XXII in order to weaken Stefan Milutin's rule. Milutin suppressed the rebels without much difficulty. In 1319, Charles I of Hungary regained control over Belgrade and the region of Mačva while Milutin held control in Braničevo. In the year 1314 Milutin's son Stefan Dečanski rebelled against his father, but was captured, blinded and sent to exile in Constantinople. For the rest of Milutin's reign his youngest son Stefan Constantine was considered as heir to the throne, but in the spring of 1321 Stefan Dečanski returned to Serbia and was pardoned by his father.

Serbia's economic power grew rapidly in the 14th century, and Milutin's power was based on new mines, mostly in Kosovo territory. During his regin, Novo Brdo was the richest silver mine in the Balkans, while another important mines were Trepča and Janjevo. He produced imitations of Venetian coins, which contained seven-eighths of silver compared to their coins. The were banned by the Republic of Venice, but Milutin used them to wage civil war against Dragutin. Later, Novo Brdo became an internationally important silver mining site and significant strategic position, while  in the 15th century, Serbia and Bosnia combined produced over 20% of European silver.

Time of his reign was marked hostility to Catholicism, particularly in coastal regions, inhabited by religiously mixed population, that included Catholics and Eastern Orthodox Christians.

Family
By his first wife, Jelena, a minor Serbian noblewoman, he had two children, King Stephen Uroš III and Anna Neda, who married Michael Shishman of Bulgaria. By his second wife, Helena, daughter of sebastokratōr John I Doukas of Thessaly, he had no children. By his third wife, Elizabeth, daughter of King Stephen V of Hungary and Elizabeth the Cuman, Milutin had a daughter, Zorica. By his fourth wife, Anna, the daughter of George I of Bulgaria, Stefan Uroš II Milutin had a son, Stefan Konstantin. By his fifth wife Simonis, the daughter of Emperor Andronikos II Palaiologos, he had no children.

Aftermath and legacy 

At the end of Milutin's life Serbia was second in strength in Southeast Europe after Hungary. During his reign many court ceremonials were taken over from the Byzantine court and Byzantine culture overflowed into Serbia. After his death a short civil war followed, after which the Serbian throne was ascended by his eldest son, Stefan Dečanski. Around 1460, the remains of the king were carried to Bulgaria and were stored in various churches and monasteries until being transferred to St Nedelya Church after it became a bishop's residence in the 18th century. With some interruptions, the remains have been preserved in the church ever since and the church acquired another name, Holy King („Свети Крал“, „Sveti Kral“), in the late 19th and early 20th century. 

Stefan Milutin is mentioned in the Dante Alighieri's narrative poem Divine Comedy with the characteristics of counterfeiters due to the copying of Venetian money. 

He is included in The 100 most prominent Serbs list.

Foundations
King Stefan Milutin founded a hospital in Constantinopole, which later became a medical school. He also erected many churches and monasteries in Serbian lands. As a ktetor, he was praised in works of Danilo II, Serbian Archbishop (1324–1337) and other medieval sources.

 Vitovnica Monastery near Petrovac, Serbia (1291)
 Church of St. Nicetas in Banjane, North Macedonia (ca. 1300)
 Our Lady of Ljeviš in Prizren (1306–1307)
 Church of Saint Nicetas the Goth in Banjane, North Macedonia (1307–1310)
Serbian Monastery of Holy Archangels, Jerusalem (1312)
 The King's Church of the Studenica monastery in Kraljevo, Serbia (1313–1314)
 Church of St. George in Kumanovo, North Macedonia (1313–1318)
 Banjska monastery near Zvečan (1318)
 Gračanica Monastery in Gračanica (1321)
 Church of Trojeručica near Skopje, North Macedonia (13-14th century)
 Church of Saint Constantine the Great in Skopje, North Macedonia (13-14th century)
 Bukovo monastery near Negotin, Serbia (13-14th century)
 Koroglaš monastery near Negotin, Serbia (14th century)
 Vratna monastery near Negotin, Serbia (14th century)

Reconstructions
 Monastery of Saints Sergius and Bacchus near Shirq (1293)
 Church of the Virgin Hodegetria in Mušutište (1314—1315)
 Church of Entrance of the Theotokos of the Hilandar monastery at the Mount Athos, Greece (1320)
 Church of St. Peter near Bijelo Polje, Montenegro (1320)
 Church of St. George near Skopje, North Macedonia (13-14th century)
 Monastery of St. Nicholas in Kožle, North Macedonia (13-14th century)
 Orahovica monastery near Priboj, Serbia (13-14th century)
 Treskavec Monastery near Prilep, North Macedonia (14th century)

See also

 Nemanjić family tree
 History of Serbia

References

Sources

 
 
 
 
 
 
 
 
 
 
 
 
 
 
 
 
 
 
 
 
 
 
 
 
 
 

1253 births
1321 deaths
13th-century Serbian monarchs
14th-century Serbian monarchs
Nemanjić dynasty
Eastern Orthodox monarchs
Burials at St Nedelya Church
Serbian saints of the Eastern Orthodox Church
Medieval Serbian military leaders
14th-century Eastern Orthodox Christians
14th-century Christian saints
Ktetors
Founders of Christian monasteries
Eastern Orthodox royal saints
Royal reburials